Nathaniel Gerard Railton (10 February 1886 – 8 September 1948) was  Archdeacon of Lindsey from 1941 until his death.

Railton was educated at Keble College, Oxford; and ordained in 1912. He began his career as Curate of St John, Fitzroy Square after which he was Rector of Toddington from 1916 to 1920. He became a Chaplain to the Forces in 1920 serving at Aldershot, York, Tidworth, and Gibraltar.

Notes

1886 births
1948 deaths
Archdeacons of Lindsey
Alumni of Keble College, Oxford
Royal Army Chaplains' Department officers